MDLR Airlines was an airline based in Gurgaon,  Haryana, India. It operated scheduled domestic services. It suspended its operations from 5 November 2009.

History 
The airline started operations on 14 March 2007, was wholly owned by Murli Dhar Lakh Ram (MDLR) Group, and had around 250 employees by September 2008. The group originated in Sirsa, Haryana in northern India. It was started by Gopal Kanda, a local politician. The airline was started in the middle of a major growth period for Indian aviation but was launched just as oil prices were climbing. It tried the full-service model promising its passengers 'pure vegetarian food', but missed lease payments to BAe for their Avro RJ70 aircraft.

Destinations 
MDLR Airlines operated scheduled services to the following domestic destinations (as of April 2009):

India

Fleet 

The MDLR Airlines fleet included the following aircraft (at September 2008):

See also 
List of airlines of India

References

External links 
MDLR Airlines
MDLR misses lease payments to BAe

Airlines established in 2007
Airlines disestablished in 2009
Defunct airlines of India
Indian companies disestablished in 2009
Indian companies established in 2007
Companies based in Gurgaon
2007 establishments in Haryana